Morović is a village located in the municipality of Šid, Srem District, Vojvodina, Serbia. As of 2011 census, it has a population of 1,744 inhabitants.

History

In the Middle Ages, Morović was a notable town. It was built by Serbian despot Stefan Štiljanović in 1498. Štiljanović used Morović as his residence until he moved to Baranya, escaping the Ottomans.

The Roman Catholic church of Saint Mary from the 13th century, built in both Romanesque and Gothic styles is a very noteworthy monument. It is located on a cemetery north of the village. The Serbian Orthodox church of the Nativity of Mary and the Roman Catholic church of Saint Roch are also located in the village.

Historical population

 1961: 2,110
 1971: 2,292
 1981: 2,196
 1991: 2,105
 2002: 2,164
 2011: 1,744

Geography
Morović is located at the confluence of the Bosut and Studva rivers and is surrounded by opulent oak forests. The Adaševci interchange on the A3 motorway is located to the north of the village. The nearby village of Jamena can only be accessed by traveling through Morović.

Sport and Hunting

Morović is most famous for its hunting area often referred to as Tito's hunting ground, it was one of his favorite hunting grounds in the time of Yugoslavia. In recent years it has attracted interest from international hunters with excellent facilities and accommodations dedicated to the sole purpose of hunting. The surrounding area contains an abundance of red deer, fellow deer, wild boar and pheasants. It spreads on 2500 hectares covered with magnificent centenary oaks. In the middle of the reserve there is Tito's hunting lodge with eight beds and another common hunting lodge with about twenty beds. The infrastructures are very good and all the reserve is very well looked after. The area also hosts a well known fishing tournament every year, the area is popular with anglers due to the surrounding rivers around Morović.

The local football club is FK Jedinstvo Morović, it currently competes in the Vojvođanska liga - Jug which is the equivalent fourth division.

Notable people
Dušan Popović (1877–1958) represented Morović in the Croatian Parliament from 1906 to 1913, while Syrmia was part of the Austro-Hungarian Empire.

See also
 List of places in Serbia
 List of cities, towns and villages in Vojvodina
 Spačva basin

References

 Slobodan Ćurčić, Broj stanovnika Vojvodine, Novi Sad, 1996.

External links 

 Hunting
 Morovic Travel photos Virtual Tourist
 Football results Serbia

Populated places in Syrmia